The surname Treyvas, Treivas or Trejvas may refer to:
Emma Treyvas (1918–1982), Soviet actress
Andrey Treivas, birth name of Michael Lucas, Russia-born American and Israeli gay porn actor 
Revekka Treivas, wife of Boris Galerkin, Russian mathematician and engineer
Roza Treyvas, wife of Nikita Khrushchev's son Leonid Khrushchev
 (1898–1937), Soviet Komsomol and Bolshevik leader 
 
Treyvas was also one of the historical names of Treyvaux, Switzerland